The Escarra Peak is a prominent mountain on the Spanish side of the Pyrenees, in the North of Jacetania comarca, in Aragon. The Escarra river has its sources beneath this peak.

This peak is part of a subrange known as Sierra de la Partacua located in an area of many high peaks.

References

External links
Corredor Norte de Punta Escarra con esquís

Mountains of the Pyrenees